Prefontaine (French: Préfontaine) is a surname of French-Canadian origin.

Préfontaine may also refer to:

Prefontaine (film), a 1997 Disney film production based on the life of Steve Prefontaine starring Jared Leto, R. Lee Ermey, and Ed O'Neill
 Without Limits (film), a 1998 Warner Bros film production based on the life of Steve Prefontaine starring Billy Crudup, Donald Sutherland, and Monica Potter
Prefontaine Classic, an annual track and field event held at the University of Oregon in Eugene, Oregon; officially known as the Nike Prefontaine Classic
Pre's Trail, a pedestrian trail in Eugene, Oregon named after Steve Prefontaine
Steve Prefontaine (1951–1975), American middle and long-distance runner
Préfontaine (Montreal Metro), a metro station named for rue Préfontaine, the aréna and the parc Raymond-Préfontaine in the city of Montréal
Prefontaine Fountain, a fountain located at Prefontaine Place in the Pioneer Square District of Seattle, Washington, both named after Father Francis X. Préfontaine, a pioneer who founded many of Seattle's early Roman Catholic institutions
Préfontaines, a commune located in the Loiret département of north-central France

See also
 Pre (disambiguation)